eThekwini Metropolitan Municipality is a metropolitan municipality created in 2000, that includes the city of Durban, South Africa and surrounding towns. eThekwini is one of the 11 districts of KwaZulu-Natal province of South Africa.  The majority of its 3,442,361 people speak Zulu. It was formed from seven formerly independent local councils and tribal land.

Etymology
In an 1859 Zulu grammar book, Bishop Colenso asserted that the root word  means "bay of the sea" taken from the Thabethe tribes clan name Mtheku which were the leaders of the Nguni people. Furthermore the original local inhabitants and noted that the locative form, was used as a proper name for Durban.

An 1895 English-Zulu dictionary translates the base word  as "bay", "creek", "gulf" or "sinus", while a 1905 Zulu-English dictionary notes that  is used for Durban.

Geography
eThekwini is surrounded by:
 iLembe (DC29) to the north 
 the Indian Ocean to the east
 Ugu (DC21) to the south
 Umgungundlovu (DC22) to the west

Main places
The 2001 census divided the municipality into the following main places:

Demographics

The following statistics are from the 2011 census.

Gender
As of 2011.

Ethnic group
As of 2011

Age

Politics
The municipal council consists of 222 members elected by mixed-member proportional representation. 111 councillors are elected by first-past-the-post voting in 111 wards, while the remaining 111 are chosen from party lists so that the total number of party representatives is proportional to the number of votes received.

Election results

In the 2021 local government elections, the African National Congress lost their majority on the city council for the first time since the metro's establishment in 2000.

The following table shows the detailed results of the election.

See also
Municipal Demarcation Board
 Mayor of eThekwini

References

External links
 eThekwini Online The official site of Durban, South Africa

 
Durban
Metropolitan Municipalities of South Africa
Municipalities of KwaZulu-Natal